Trần Anh Hùng (born December 23, 1962) is a Vietnamese-born French film director and screenwriter.

Early life
Hùng was born in Mỹ Tho, South Vietnam. Following the fall of Saigon at the end of the Vietnam War in 1975, he immigrated to France at age 12.

He majored in philosophy at a university in France. By chance, he saw Robert Bresson's film A Man Escaped and decided to study film instead.
He went on to study photography at the Louis Lumiere Academy, which trains cinematographers.

Film career
Hùng has been at the forefront of a wave of acclaimed overseas Vietnamese cinema over the past two decades. His films have received international fame and acclaim, and his first three features were varied meditations on life in his home country Vietnam.

Hùng's Oscar-nominated debut (for Best foreign film) was The Scent of Green Papaya (1993), which also won two top prizes at the Cannes Film Festival. His follow-up Cyclo (1995, which featured Hong Kong movie star Tony Leung Chiu-Wai), won the Golden Lion at the Venice International Film Festival. The Vertical Ray of the Sun, released in 2000, was the third film in his "Vietnam trilogy."

After a sabbatical, Hùng returned with the noir psychological thriller I Come with the Rain (2009), which featured a star-studded international cast including Josh Hartnett and Elias Koteas.

Hùng directed Norwegian Wood, an adaptation of Haruki Murakami's novel of the same name, which released in Japan in December 2010.

Films on Vietnam
In France, Hùng studied at the prestigious film school Louis Lumière College. For his graduation project in 1987 he wrote and directed a short film Người thiếu phụ Nam Xương, inspired by an old Vietnamese folk tale (Truyền kỳ mạn lục).

Following this Hùng made another short film, Hòn vọng phu (1989), before launching the feature film The Scent of Green Papaya (1993). The Scent of Green Papaya was acclaimed for its style and its beautiful images of Vietnamese life.  To date, the film is the only representative of Vietnamese cinema to be nominated for Academy Award for Best Foreign Language Film.

The success of Papaya helped Hùng gain funding for the next film, Cyclo. The film tells stories of poor people living in Saigon (now Ho Chi Minh City), and was filmed on location there. Cyclo won the Golden Lion at 52nd Venice International Film Festival, and at the age of 33, Hùng was one of the youngest filmmakers to be thus honored there.

Having depicted life in Ho Chi Minh City, Hùng turned his attention to Hanoi in The Vertical Ray of the Sun (2000). The main characters of the film are three sisters who idolize their parents' family life, before the truth is revealed after the mother's death.

All three feature films were financed by Christophe Rossignon (Lazenecs film company).

Influences and style of film-making
Hùng's films are made so as to rebuild the image of Vietnam that he has lost when immigrating into France and to provide audience with another point of view on Vietnam while this topic has been long dominated by French and American cinema. The stories are based on Hùng's knowledge about Vietnamese culture and (in the second and third films) his first-hand experience gained from trips to the country.

Hùng is strongly influenced by French cinema and from some European and Japanese filmmakers, namely Bergman, Bresson, Kurosawa, Tarkovsky and Ozu.

Hùng's style of filmmaking is expressed through the claim: "Art is the truth wearing a mask" (interview originally in Vietnamese). He denies the conventional story-telling style and pursues making films with a new language: "to challenge the audiences' feelings, making them enjoy the films not with the critical reasoning but the language of the body".

As a banner of Vietnamese films, Anh Hung Tran, a French-Vietnamese director, broke the image of poverty and backwardness in the past American and French films with his unique camera images, showing the audience a Vietnam where tenderness and cruelty coexist. In Vietnam, Hùng's most famous "trilogy"—The Scent of Green Papaya (1993), Cyclo (1995), and The Vertical Ray of the Sun (2000)—expresses feelings for the motherland.

Filmography

References

External links

 Dan Bloom, "Norwei no mori" goes to Hollywood RushPRnews

1962 births
Living people
French film directors
Vietnamese film directors
20th-century French screenwriters
21st-century French screenwriters
French male screenwriters
Vietnamese screenwriters
Vietnamese emigrants to France
Directors of Caméra d'Or winners
Directors of Golden Lion winners
People from Mỹ Tho